Christian Alexander Jojo (born 11 February 1999) is a Hong Kong professional footballer who currently plays as a defender for Hong Kong Premier League club Eastern.

Club career
On 29 August 2019, Jojo signed his first professional contract with Hong Kong Premier League club Happy Valley.

On 1 July 2020, Jojo signed with Eastern following the expiry of his contract with Happy Valley.

International career
On 28 April 2021, Jojo officially announced that he had received a Hong Kong passport after giving up his British passport and Swedish passport, making him eligible to represent Hong Kong internationally.

Career statistics

Club

Notes

References

External links
Alex Jojo at HKFA

1999 births
Living people
English footballers
English expatriate footballers
Swedish footballers
Swedish expatriate footballers
Hong Kong footballers
Association football defenders
Happy Valley AA players
Eastern Sports Club footballers
Hong Kong Premier League players